Thomas Berling (born 21 January 1979) is a Norwegian former professional footballer who played as a defender. His retirement from football sparked media attention.

He hails from Drevja. He played for Nardo FK, and joined Lyn ahead of the 1999 season. He played three games in the second highest Norwegian league, and also played for the under-19 national team.

In 2000, he disappeared from professional football. It later surfaced that he had come out as gay, and that he quit football as a result of what he described as widespread homophobia in the football community. In 2001, he briefly came out of retirement, playing for lower league Drøbak/Frogn IF.

Berling's case was cited several times in the upcoming years, as the connection between homophobia and sport was discussed in the national media now and then.

See also
 Athlete Ally
 Homosexuality in sports
 Principle 6 campaign

References

External links
 

1979 births
Living people
Sportspeople from Nordland
Norwegian footballers
Norway youth international footballers
Association football defenders
Lyn Fotball players
Drøbak-Frogn IL players
Norwegian First Division players
Norwegian LGBT sportspeople
Gay sportsmen
LGBT association football players